Indian Military Historical Society (IMHS) is an organisation and learned society, which is based primarily in the United Kingdom but with a wide membership extending to the British Commonwealth and several other countries around the world. The society closed in December 2020, back issues of 'Durbar' their journal are now held by the UK-based The Military Historical Society (behind a paywall).

Background and Officers
The IMHS was founded in 1983 to bring together all those people who were enthusiasts, amateurs as well as professionals, research scholars, military historians etc., who had an interest in the military history of the Indian Subcontinent, especially the old British Indian Army prior to 1947, although later studies/interest were also not discouraged.

The Society's principal officers were: President: Field-Marshal Sir John Chapple; Vice-President: Rana Chhina; and Secretary: C Kempton. The IMHS used to bring out a well-known journal, Durbar, every four months, which is very highly regarded by researchers and scholars and subject-specialists, for the quality and originality of its publications.

References

1983 establishments in the United Kingdom
Professional associations based in the United Kingdom
Learned societies of the United Kingdom
Organizations established in 1983